The 2020 LSU Tigers softball team represents Louisiana State University in the 2020 NCAA Division I softball season. The Tigers play their home games at Tiger Park.  The 2020 softball season was cut short due to the 2020 Covid-19 Pandemic.  As a result LSU had not played any conference games when the season ended on March 11, 2020.  One notable highlight of the season was the program's first ever 7-inning perfect game thrown by Maribeth Gorsuch in a 4-0 victory over the Belmont Bruins on February 22, 2020.

Previous season

The Tigers finished the 2019 season 43–19 overall, and 14–10 in the SEC to finish in a tie for second in the conference. The Tigers hosted a regional during the 2019 NCAA Division I softball tournament and later advanced to the Minneapolis Super Regional against Minnesota. The Tigers were defeated by the Golden Gophers 0 games to 2 as Minnesota advanced to the WCWS.

Preseason

SEC preseason poll
The SEC preseason poll was released on January 15, 2020.

Schedule and results
{| class="toccolours" width=95% style="clear:both; margin:1.5em auto; text-align:center;"
|-
! colspan=2 style="" | 2020 LSU Tigers Softball Game Log
|-
! colspan=2 style="" | Regular Season 
|- valign="top"
|
{| class="wikitable collapsible" style="margin:auto; width:100%; text-align:center; font-size:95%"
! colspan=12 style="padding-left:4em;" | February 
|-
! Date
! Opponent
! Rank
! Site/Stadium
! Score
! Win
! Loss
! Save
! TV
! Attendance
! Overall Record
! SEC Record
|- align="center" bgcolor="#ccffcc"
|February 6|| Central Arkansas || No. 11 || Tiger ParkBaton Rouge, LA || W 3–2 || S. Sunseri (1–0) || R. Sanchez (0–1) || A. Kilponen (1) || SECN+ || 1,356 || 1–0 || 
|- align="center" bgcolor="#ccffcc"
|February 7|| No. 13 Oklahoma State || No. 11 || Tiger Park || W 1–0 || S. Wickersham (1–0) || C. Eberle (0–1) || A. Kilponen (2) || SECN+ || 1,536 || 2–0 || 
|- align="center" bgcolor="#ccffcc"
|February 8|| Florida A&M || No. 11 || Tiger Park || W 8–0  || S. Sunseri (2–0) || N. Zenteno (0–1) ||  || SECN+ || 1,685 || 3–0 ||
|- align="center" bgcolor="#ccffcc"
|February 8|| No. 13 Oklahoma State || No. 11 || Tiger Park || W 3–2 || M. Gorsuch (1–0) || K. Maxwell (1–1) ||  || SECN+ || 1,934 || 4–0 ||
|- align="center" bgcolor="#ccffcc"
|February 9|| Florida A&M || No. 11 || Tiger Park || W 16–0  || A. Kilponen (1–0) || B. Boatwright (0–2) ||  || SECN+ || 1,361 || 5–0 ||
|- align="center" bgcolor="#ccffcc"
|February 14|| Samford || No. 7 || Tiger Park || W 4–0 || A. Kilponen (2–0) || T. DeCelles (1–1) ||  || SECN+ || 1,356 || 6–0 ||
|- align="center" bgcolor="#ffcccc"
|February 15|| at No. 13 Louisiana || No. 7 || Lamson ParkLafayette, LA || L 1–2 || M. Kleist (3–1) || M. Gorsuch (1–1) ||  || ESPN+ || 3,107 || 6–1 ||
|- align="center" bgcolor="#ccffcc"
|February 16|| North Dakota || No. 7 || Tiger Park || W 8–0  || S. Wickersham (2–0) || J. Jones (1–3) ||  || SECN+ || 1,398 || 7–1 ||
|- align="center" bgcolor="#ccffcc"
|February 16|| No. 13 Louisiana || No. 7 || Tiger Park || W 4–3 || A. Kilponen (3–0) || M. Kleist (3–2) ||  || SECN+ || 2,246 || 8–1 ||
|- align="center" bgcolor="#ccffcc"
|February 19|| Louisiana Tech || No. 6 || Tiger Park ||W 9-2  ||  M. Gorsuch (2-1) || B. Hernandez (2-2)  ||  || SECN+ || 1,297 || 9-1 ||
|- align="center" bgcolor="#ccffcc"
|February 21|| Belmont || No. 6 || Tiger Park ||W 4-0  || A. Kilponen (4-0)  || B. Lee (0-1) ||  || - || 1,295|| 10-1 ||
|- align="center" bgcolor="ccffcc"
|February 21|| Sam Houston State || No. 6 || Tiger Park || W 12-0 (5) ||  S. Wickersham  (3-0) || K. Sanchez (0-2) ||  || SECN+ || 1,295 || 11-1 ||
|- align="center" bgcolor="#ccffcc"
|February 22|| Sam Houston State || No. 6 || Tiger Park || W 20-4 (5) || Shelbi Sunseri (3-0)  || Darby Fitzpatrick (2-2) ||  || SECN+ || 1,345 || 12-1 ||
|- align="center" bgcolor="#ccffcc"
|February 22|| Belmont || No. 6 || Tiger Park || W 4-0 || Maribeth Gorsuch (3-1)  || Brittany Kennett (1-3) ||  || SECN+ || 1,535 || 13-1 ||
|- align="center" bgcolor="#ffcccc"
|February 27|| vs. Loyola Marymount || No. 4 || Anderson Family FieldFullerton, CA || L 0-1 || Linnay Wilson (4-3) || Ali Kilponen (4-1) ||  || FLOSOFTBALL || 235 || 13-2 ||
|- align="center" bgcolor="#ccffcc"
|February 27|| vs. No. 25 Texas Tech || No. 4 || Anderson Family Field ||W 6-5  || Shelbi Sunseri (4-0) || GiGi Wall (1-2) ||  || FLOSOFTBALL || 435 || 14-2 ||
|- align="center" bgcolor="#ccffcc"
|February 28|| vs. California || No. 4 || Anderson Family Field || W 5-1 || Shelbi Sunseri (5-0) || Chloe Romero (4-4) ||  || FLOSOFTBALL || 201 || 15-2 ||
|- align="center" bgcolor="#ffcccc"
|February 28|| vs. No. 2 Washington || No. 4 || Anderson Family Field || L 1-3 || Pat Moore (6-0)  || Shelby Wickersham (3-1) ||  || FLOSOFTBALL || 389 || 15-3 ||
|- align="center" bgcolor="#ccffcc"
|February 29|| vs. Colorado State || No. 4 || Anderson Family Field || W 6-2 || Shelby Wickersham (4-1)  || Taylor Gilmore (3-3) ||  || FLOSOFTBALL || 376 || 16-3 ||
|}
|-
|

|-
|

|-
|

|-
! colspan=2 style="" | Post-Season 
|-
|

|- 
! colspan=9 | Legend:       = Win       = Loss       = CancelledBold = LSU team member
|}Source:'''
*Rankings are based on the team's current ranking in the NFCA poll.

Rankings

References

LSU
LSU Tigers softball seasons
LSU Tigers softball